Yahya Dagriri (born August 13, 1991), is a Saudi Arabian professional footballer who plays for Mudhar as a forward .

External links 
 

1991 births
Living people
Hetten FC players
Ittihad FC players
Najran SC players
Damac FC players
Al-Washm Club players
Al-Anwar Club players
Al-Houra FC players
Mudhar Club players
Saudi Arabian footballers
Saudi Arabia youth international footballers
Saudi First Division League players
Saudi Professional League players
Saudi Second Division players
Saudi Third Division players
Saudi Fourth Division players
Association football forwards